The 1887 AHAC season was the inaugural season of the Amateur Hockey Association of Canada. Play was in challenges. The Montreal Crystals defeated the Montreal Victorias to win the final challenge of the season to claim the Canadian championship and the first league championship.

League business 
The AHAC was organized on December 8, 1886, when the representatives of various hockey clubs met at the Victoria Skating Rink in Montreal at the instigation of the Victoria Hockey Club of Montreal. The first executive was composed of:

 President: Thomas D. Green, Ottawa.
 First vice-president: Jack Arnton, Victorias.
 Second vice-president: Robert Laing, Crystals.
 Secretary-treasurer: E. Stevenson, Victorias.
 Council: James Stewart, Crystals; J. G. Monk, Victorias; Hanbury A. Budden, McGill; E. Sheppard, M.A.A.A.: Percy Myles, Ottawa.

Regular season 
A.E. Swift from the Quebec HC played four games for the Victorias, being possibly the first hockey player to play for a city other than their home. 

The season's final match, held in the Victoria Rink on March 11 ended 3–2 for Montreal Crystals over the Montreal Victorias. The Vics had won the previous two meetings between the clubs. The Crystals changed their lineup, replacing F. Dowd, R. Laing and J. McGoldrick. The Crystals took the early lead on two goals by S. McQuisten. The Vics appeared to score a goal, but it was ruled to be too high and did not count. In the second half, D. Brown, one of the replacements, scored the third for Crystals before two goals by T. Arnton made it close.

Overall record 

† National Champion

Source: Ultimate Hockey

Schedule and results 

Source: 

Montreal Crystals final champions of the season.

Source: Montreal Gazette

Player statistics

Scoring leaders 
Note: GP=Games played, G=Goals

Goaltender averages 
Note: GP = Games played, GA = Goals against, SO = Shutouts, GAA = Goals against average

Winter Carnival Tournament 
In February, the Montreal teams of the AHAC participated in the Montreal Winter Carnival ice hockey tournament. The tournament, which was scheduled to play outdoors on an ice rink at the Ice Palace, was disrupted by two days of storms, and was not completed until February 25. During this time, no AHAC challenges were played.

Montreal HC wins Winter Carnival Tournament.

Source: The Montreal Gazette, The Montreal Daily Herald, Montreal Daily Witness, The Montreal Daily Post

References

Bibliography

Notes

Amateur Hockey Association of Canada seasons
AHAC